David Paul Rawson (September 10, 1941 – September 16, 2020) was an American diplomat who served as the United States Ambassador Extraordinary and Plenipotentiary to Rwanda and Mali. His service in Rwanda occurred during the Rwandan genocide of 1994.

Early life and education 
Rawson was born in Addison, Michigan as the son of missionaries. In 1947 he moved to Burundi with his parents, where his father ran a medical clinic.

In 1958, Rawson returned to the United States and attended Malone College (B.A.) and American University (M.A. and PhD). After completing his PhD, he returned to Malone College and taught for six years before joining the United States Department of State. Rawson also received a postdoctoral grant to investigate the relationship between the political situation and religious culture in the countries of Rwanda and Burundi.

Career 
From 1986 to 1988, Rawson was a deputy chief of mission for the American Embassy in Somalia, and from 1989-1991, he was director of the Office of West African Affairs within the State Department's Bureau of African Affairs.

From 1993 to 1996, Rawson served as an ambassador to Rwanda, a nation then experiencing ethnic tensions between the Hutus and Tutsis. When the plane of Rwandan president Juvénal Habyarimana, a Hutu, was shot down, the Hutus blamed it on the Tutsis, leading to a genocide between April and July 1994. The United States government ordered American officials, including Rawson, to leave the country.

After the Rwandan Patriotic Front took control of the government in July 1994, Rawson returned to Rwanda to provide emergency relief and to negotiate peace agreements. Rawson later stated, however, that he believed he failed in his role as a peacekeeper during his tenure as ambassador.

From 1996 to 1999, Rawson served as the U.S. ambassador to the Republic of Mali.

Post-diplomatic career 
After retiring from foreign affairs in 1999, Rawson moved to Michigan and taught at Spring Arbor University and Hillsdale College.

After 2018 Rawson lived in Oregon and taught at George Fox University. He donated his personal archives to the university, including declassified documents used in the research of his book Prelude to Genocide: Arusha, Rwanda, and the Failure of Diplomacy.

Personal life 
Rawson's first wife Viola Mosher died in an automobile accident in 1977. He was in the vehicle at the time of the crash and stated that this incident was the "most trying circumstance" of his life.

Rawson was a Christian. Rawson lived in Newberg, Oregon until his death on September 16, 2020.

See also 
 List of ambassadors of the United States to Rwanda
 List of ambassadors of the United States to Mali
 Rwandan genocide
 Rwandan Civil War

References 

1941 births
2020 deaths
People from Lenawee County, Michigan
Malone University alumni
American University alumni
United States Foreign Service personnel
Ambassadors of the United States to Rwanda
Ambassadors of the United States to Mali
George Fox University faculty
People from Newberg, Oregon